The Thruxton Circuit is a  motor-racing circuit located near the village of Thruxton in Hampshire, England, United Kingdom, about 30 miles north of Southampton.

It has hosted motorsport events including the British Touring Car Championship, British GT Championship, British Formula One Championship, British Formula Three, and GB3 Championship.

The site also houses the headquarters of the British Automobile Racing Club (BARC).

History 
The site was originally constructed in 1942 as RAF Thruxton, a World War II airfield which was home to both the RAF and USAAF and was used for troop-carrying aircraft and gliders, including operations during the D-Day landings. Also, the paratroopers who took part in the successful Bruneval Raid (Operation Biting), in which German radar equipment was seized on the coast of France, took off from here.

The circuit, which follows the line of the airfield's perimeter road, was established in 1968. From 1950 to 1965, motorbike races had taken place on the runways and perimeter road.

Motorsport activities

Owing to planning restrictions, the circuit can only run 12 days of motorsport each year. Currently, three are devoted to motorbike racing, with a weekend dedicated to the British Superbike Championship, Britain's premier motorcycle racing category; with the third day being used for club racing.

The remaining days are devoted to car racing with weekends being used for the TOCA British Touring Car Championship, the British Formula 3 and British GT Championship package and the Dunlop Great and British Festival, which features rounds of the British Truck Racing Championship, the International Truck Racing Challenge as well as the staples of the festival, including the Radical endurance races. Two separate one day meetings are run for amateur championships of the BARC, one of which is titled the Thruxton Classic, which features races for Classic Touring Cars, Classic Formula Ford 1600 and Formula Ford 2000. The remaining day is allocated to other organising clubs, such as the 750 Motor Club and Historic Sports Car Club. Owing to the relative infrequency of race meetings, Thruxton continues to be a popular part of the motorsport calendar.

Lap records 

The all-time outright unofficial track record is 57.6 seconds, set by Damon Hill in a Williams FW15C, during a demonstration run in 1993. The official race lap records at the Thruxton Circuit are listed as:

Medical and safety services
Thruxton has a medical centre in line with Motor Sports Association standards.

The MSA circuit licence requires a minimum of two doctors and two rescue units for a race meeting.  Most meetings are operated with three rescue units plus a medical car, along with ambulances and first aiders.

Points of interest
During race weekends, a radio commentary service called Radio Thruxton operates in the FM band on 87.7 MHz. This has commentators at key points of the track as well as a pit reporter, who conducts interviews with the race winners.

Outside of motor racing, the circuit offers a driving school for aspiring racing drivers. It has featured as the venue for BBC3's 2005 series Stars in Fast Cars.

The "Thruxton" heritage
As a result of its racing associations, the name "Thruxton" has been used for:
Triumph Thruxton, a series of café racer motorcycles
Velocette Thruxton, a sport motorcycle
Thruxton handlebars, a type of motorcycle handlebar that is shaped to provide a clip-on-type handlebar position, but which clamps on top of the yoke rather than onto the fork stanchions. Thruxton handlebars are also known as "Ace 'bars" or "Clubman 'bars".

Thruxton Hospitality Centre
The Thruxton Hospitality Centre was opened in June 2018 by Nigel Mansell and Murray Walker. The £2million flagship building is the latest addition to the circuit, forming part of the track's modernisation project. The new building is a 1415m² facility with more than ten conference and function rooms as well as hospitality suites, a restaurant and bar, an exhibition space and catering facilities. A first floor terrace and balcony provides a view of the first-corner and across the venue.

Driving experiences 
Aside from hosting major motor racing events, Thruxton Motorsport Centre offers driving experiences.

See also
 Thruxton 500

Notes

References

External links

 

Motorsport venues in England
Sports venues in Hampshire